Biswas (pronounced in Bengali as "bish-shash") is a surname commonly used by the Bengali community. The surname was an honorary title bestowed on persons by the British who were relied upon for the work of accounts, receipts and expenditure. Among Bengali Hindus, the surname is associated primarily with Mahishyas, Scheduled Castes and Kayasthas as well. The surname is also found among some Muslim, Brahmins and Christian Bengalis. In Bengali, Biswas means faith or trust.

Notable people
Abdur Rahman Biswas (1926–2017), former president of Bangladesh.
Anangsha Biswas, Indian actress
Anil Biswas (composer) (1914–2003), Indian film music composer
Anil Biswas (politician) (nickname 'Keru') (1944–2006), Indian politician
Antara Biswas, Indian actress
Apu Biswas, Bangladeshi actress who appears in Dhallywood films
Barun Biswas (1972–2012), Bengali school teacher and social activist
Basanta Kumar Biswas (1895–1915), independence activist involved in the Jugantar
Birendra Bijoy Biswas, Indian scientist
Biswamoy Biswas (1923–1994), Indian ornithologist
Chhabi Biswas (1900–1962), Bengali character actor
Charu Chandra Biswas, CIE, Indian Judge, Union Minister and Vice Chancellor of the University of Calcutta
Debabrata Biswas (1911–1980), Bengali singer
Debabrata Biswas (politician) (born 1945), politician from All India Forward Bloc and a Member of the Parliament of India
Dipendu Biswas, Indian international football player
Hemanga Biswas, exponent of the Bhantiali folk music, originally popular among the fishermen of Bangladesh
Kanti Biswas, Indian politician and former minister of West Bengal
Muhammad Abdul Latif Biswas, politician, diplomat, and freedom fighter from Bangladesh
Pratim Biswas, Dean of the College of Engineering at the University of Miami
Pulak Biswas (born 1941), artist and children's book illustrator from India
Ramakrishna Biswas, (born 1910), Bengali revolutionary and martyr
Robert Biswas-Diener (born 1972), positive psychologist, researcher, author and instructor at Portland State University
Seema Biswas (born 1965), Indian film and theatre actress
Soma Biswas (born 1978), athlete of Kolkata, India and who specialises in the heptathlon
Soumili Biswas, Bengali television serial actress
Suhas Biswas first Air Force Officer, awarded the Ashoka Chakra
Suresh Biswas, 19th century adventurer from India
Sutapa Biswas (born 1962), British Indian conceptual artist
Timir Biswas (born 1982), playback singer, songwriter, composer and the lead singer of the band Fakira
U. N. Biswas, an Indian Buddhist politician and the former Minister for Backward Class Welfare from West Bengal
Ujjal Biswas, Indian politician and the present Minister for technical education in the Government of West Bengal

See also
 A House for Mr. Biswas, 1961 novel by V. S. Naipaul.

References

Indian surnames
Bengali-language surnames
Bengali Hindu surnames